XHLUP-FM is a radio station on 89.1 FM in Las Varas and Compostela, Nayarit, known as Radio Lupita.

History
XHLUP began as XEEF-AM 1130, awarded to Julio Mondragón González on July 28, 1973. By the 1990s, the station was XELUP-AM.

In 2011, XELUP migrated to FM as XHLUP-FM 89.1.

References

Radio stations in Nayarit